Owch Gonbad-e Khan (also Romanized as Owch Gonbad-e Khān and Ūchgonbad-e Khān) is a village in Taghamin Rural District, Korani District, Bijar County, Kurdistan Province, Iran. At the 2006 census, its population was 330, in 77 families. The village is populated by Azerbaijanis.

References 

Towns and villages in Bijar County
Azerbaijani settlements in Kurdistan Province